Siegfried Hansen (born 1961) is a German street photographer known for his work in Hamburg. He was a member of the In-Public street photography collective.

Hansen has produced the books Hold the Line (2015) and Schlagermove (2017), and his work is included in a number of survey publications on street photography. His work has been shown in solo exhibitions in Germany and in group exhibitions at Deichtorhallen in Hamburg and at Museo di Roma in Trastevere in Rome.

Life
Hansen was born in 1961 in Meldorf, Germany. He lives and works in Hamburg, Germany.

Work
Hansen began as a street photographer in 2002 and joined the In-Public street photography collective in 2014. His work has been included in Fotoforum; Photographie; LFI, Leica Fotografie International; Professional Photographer and Fotocommunity Plus.

Jim Casper of LensCulture wrote that "every single image in the book is a gem." Michael Ernest Sweet, writing in HuffPost in 2017, listed Hansen as one of the 12 best contemporary street photographers in the world.

In 2017, Hansen appeared as a guest photographer in an episode of Master of Photography, a TV series reality show.

Exhibitions

Solo exhibitions
Der erwartete Zufall, Galerie Kunst-Nah, Hamburg, Germany, 2012.
Hold The Line, Freelens Galerie, Hamburg, Germany, 2015.
Streetphotography - Hold The Line, Palais für aktuelle Kunst, Glückstadt, Germany, 2016.

Group exhibitions
Street Photography Now, Third Floor Gallery, Cardiff, October–November 2010, and toured to Contributed Studio for the Arts, Berlin, December 2010 – January 2011; Museum of Printing, Historical Museum of Warsaw, Warsaw, November 2011 – January 2012. Photographs from the book Street Photography Now (2011).
Fascination Street, as a member of the group Seconds2Real, Berlin, Galerie Meinblau, 2011.
From Distant Street, Contemporary International Street Photography, Galerie Hertz, Louisville, USA, 2011.
Street Photography Now, Warsaw, 2011. One of forty participants.
Fascination Street, as a member of the group Seconds2Real, Galerie Anzensberger, Vienna, 2012.
The Sharp Eye. In-Public in Mexico, Foto Mexico, Cine Tonalá, Mexico City, Mexico, October–November 2015. Slideshow of photographs by various In-Public members. Curated by Mark Powell, Carlos Álvarez Montero and Alfredo Esparza.
Miami Street Photography Festival, Art Basel Miami Beach, 2013.
"Via!" – Fotografia di Strada da Amburgo a Palermo, = Street Photography from Hamburg to Palermo, Museo di Roma in Trastevere, Rome, Italy, January 2015 – April 2016
[Space] Street. Life. Photography: Seven Decades of Street Photography, Deichtorhallen, during the Triennial of Photography, Hamburg, Germany, June–October 2018. 350 works from 50 photographers.
[Space] Street. Life. Photography: Seven Decades of Street Photography, KunstHausWien, Vienna, Austria, September 2019 – February 2020. 200 works from 35 photographers.

Publications

Publications by Hansen
Hold the Line. Dortmund: Kettler, 2015. .
Schlagermove. Enfants Eigenverlag, 2017.
THE FLOW OF LINES Eyeshot -publisher, 2020.

Publications with contributions by Hansen
Publication #1. London: Nick Turpin, 2009. Essays by Hin Chua, David Gibson, Michael David Murphy and Turpin. Includes a chapter on Hansen.
Street Photography Now. London: Thames and Hudson, 2010. . Includes a chapter on Hansen.
Grossartige Fotografen und ihre Leidenschaften. Addison- Wesley Verlag, Munich 2015, . Includes a chapter on Hansen. 
Who's Who in Visual Art. Art Domain Whois, 2015. . Includes a chapter on Hansen.
Fifty Path to Creative Photography. (Michael Freemann) London: Octopus, 2016. . Contains a commentary on and a photograph by Hansen.
World Street Photography 3. Hamburg: Gudberg, 2016. . Includes a chapter on Hansen.
100 Great Street Photographs. London: Prestel, 2017. By David Gibson. . Contains a commentary on and a photograph by Hansen.
Streetphotography. Die 100 besten Bilder. Munich: Prestel, 2017. .
50 Wege zur kreativen Fotografie. Frechen: mitp, 2017. . Contains a commentary on and a photograph by Hansen.
World Street Photography 5. Hamburg: Gudberg, 2018. . Includes a chapter on Hansen.
Breaking Point - publisher:Hartmann Books, 2018. . Includes a chapter on Hansen.
Streetfotografie. Der Atem der Straße. Munich: Franzis, 2018. . Text by Andreas Pacek. Includes a chapter on Hansen.
Street. Life. Photography: Street Photography aus sieben Jahrzehnten: Seven decades of street photography. Heidelberg: Kehrer, 2018. . Includes a chapter on Hansen. Published in conjunction with an exhibition at Deichtorhallen.
Streetfotografie made in Germany. Bonn: Rheinwerk, 2018. . Includes a chapter on Hansen.
Street Photography: A History In 100 Iconic Images. London: Prestel, 2019. By David Gibson. . Includes a chapter on Hansen.

Notes

References

External links

 "Interview with Siegfried Hansen – Veteran Street Photographer from Germany" 121clicks, March 2014
 "Capturing harmony on the streets" Interview by Eric Kim, December 2013 
 Siegfried Hansen, Hamburg Street Photographer, interview
 

1961 births
Living people
Photographers from Schleswig-Holstein
Street photographers
German contemporary artists
People from Meldorf